Yunyye Bezbozhniki: zhurnal shkol'nogo bezbozhnogo aktiva (translation of the name: «Young Atheists: Magazine of Atheist Schoolchildren-Activists», or «Young Godless: Magazine of Godless Schoolchildren-Activists») was a monthly magazine for schoolchildren, an organ of the Central Committee of the Komsomol, the People's Commissariat of Education of the RSFSR and the Central Soviet of the League of Militant Atheists of the USSR.

It was published in Moscow from March 1931 to February 1933. A total of 23 issues were printed. «Yunyye Bezbozhniki» gave a broad and entertaining information on the history of religion and atheism, science, technology, as well as on the atheistic movement among young people in the USSR and abroad. The magazine provided scientific and methodological assistance in the atheistic education of students, summarized the experience of anti-religious school circles. The editor-in-chief of the magazine «Yunyye Bezbozhniki» was the famous Moscow teacher-atheist I. A. Flerov. Editorial Board: N. Amosov, A. Smirnov, I. Flerov. In the magazine published works: L. Kassil, S. Kirsanov, V. Smirnova, M. Gershenzon, G. Gradov, A, Nasimovich, N. Sher and others. The magazine included works by cartoonists D. Moor, P. Staronosov, A. Korotkin, A. Kozlov and others.

The slogan of the magazine, which was printed above the title of the magazine on the right: «The struggle against religion – the struggle for socialism» (Russian: «Борьба против религии — борьба за социализм»). The magazine was published by the Publishing House «Moskovskiy Rabochiy» («Moscow Worker»), OGIZ.

See also 

 Bezbozhnik (newspaper)
 Council for Religious Affairs
 Culture of the Soviet Union
 Demographics of the Soviet Union
 Persecutions of the Catholic Church and Pius XII
 Persecution of Christians in the Soviet Union
 Persecution of Christians in Warsaw Pact countries
 Persecution of Muslims in the former USSR
 Red Terror
 Religion in Russia
 Religion in the Soviet Union
 Society of the Godless
 Soviet Orientalist studies in Islam
 State atheism
 USSR anti-religious campaign (1917–1921)
 USSR anti-religious campaign (1921–1928)
 USSR anti-religious campaign (1928–1941)
 USSR anti-religious campaign (1958–1964)
 USSR anti-religious campaign (1970s–1990)

Notes

References
 Атеистический словарь / [Абдусамедов А. И., Алейник Р. М., Алиева Б. А. и др. ; под общ. ред. М. П. Новикова]. - 2-е изд., испр. и доп. - Москва : Политиздат, 1985. - 512 с.; 20 см / С. 509

Magazines established in 1931
1933 disestablishments in the Soviet Union
Magazines published in Moscow
1931 establishments in the Soviet Union
Magazines disestablished in 1933
Monthly magazines published in Russia
Atheism publications
Magazines published in the Soviet Union
Russian-language magazines
Propaganda in the Soviet Union
Anti-religious campaign in the Soviet Union
Anti-Christian sentiment in Europe
Anti-Christian sentiment in Asia
Propaganda newspapers and magazines
Persecution of Muslims
Religious persecution by communists
Anti-Islam sentiment in the Soviet Union